"Too Young" is a song by American actor and singer Jack Wagner. It was released as a single in 1985 from his second album, Lighting Up the Night.

The song was written by David Foster, Jay Graydon, Steve Kipner and Donny Osmond and was produced by Glen Ballard and Clif Magness. It reached number 52 on the Billboard Hot 100 and remained on the chart for fourteen weeks. On the Billboard Adult Contemporary chart, the song peaked at number 15. In Canada, the song reached number 4 on its Adult Contemporary chart.

Charts

References

1985 songs
1985 singles
Jack Wagner (actor) songs
Songs written by David Foster
Songs written by Jay Graydon
Songs written by Steve Kipner
Qwest Records singles
Rock ballads
Song recordings produced by Glen Ballard
1980s ballads